The 1958 Arkansas Razorbacks football team represented the University of Arkansas during the 1958 NCAA University Division football season. It was their first season under head coach Frank Broyles.

Schedule

Roster
Richard Bell
Billy Kyser
Billy Gilbow, g
Billy Michael
Jim Mooty, b
Barry Switzer,c
Bill Michael,t
Red Childress,e
Billy Luplow,g

Staff
Athletic Director: John Barnhill

Head Coach: Frank Broyles

Assistants: Doug Dickey (DB), Merrill Green (OB), Jim Mackenzie (DL), Wilson Matthews (DE/LB), Dixie White (OL), Steed White (OE)

Results

Hardin–Simmons
The game featured two kickoffs returned 100 yards each for touchdowns by Jim Mooty and Billy Kyser, both of Arkansas.

Honors and awards
All-SWC
 Jim Mooty (1st Team)
Billy Gilbow (Dallas Morning News All Southwest Conference Team)
Most valuable Senior Razorback at Homecoming: Billy Gilbow, Blytheville, Arkansas

Crip Hall Homecoming Performance by a Senior: Billy Gilbow

References

Arkansas
Arkansas Razorbacks football seasons
Arkansas Razorbacks football